Wolfsbach is a river of Hesse, Germany. It is a right tributary of the Seemenbach near Büdingen.

See also
List of rivers of Hesse

References

Rivers of Hesse
Rivers of Germany